Bharath Stores is a 2012 Indian Kannada-language film directed by P. Sheshadri, starring Sudharani, H. G. Dattatreya, Chi Guru Dutt, V. Manohar and others. The film deals with issue of Foreign direct investment (FDI) in Indian retail industry, and the impact of introduction of multi brand retail outlets on small retailers.

Plot
Bharathi has come to Bengaluru after nine years with her husband, Sharath. She had promised her father that she would repay his dues to Mr Govinda Shetty. Only then did her father die in peace. Mr Govinda Shetty inherited the small grocery shop, "Bharath Stores" and was carrying on the family business with pride and such elan that the bus stop in front was named after it as "Bharath stores stop" After alighting near that stop, she was surprised to find no trace of it anywhere there. The queries to that effect went in vain.
 
Now the frantic search begins. By the fruition of a dedicated search, she meets Chandru and Manjunath, who had worked in that shop. Chandru tells her how he learnt along with the tricks of the trade, to be humane from him. Manjunath tells her, he stayed in the shop till the end until Shetty was hospitalized. He brings her to the old age home. Bharathi finds Shetty there gazing at nothing, having stopped speaking for months and unable to react to her.
 
Guess the reason behind Shetty's present status?
 
Certainly not the events in his life, like Balaji, his son showing contempt to the family business, his love marriage nor his leaving the house for ever. Shetty showed his strong willpower at such situations.
 
Globalisation, liberalisation and industrialisation brought the countries nearer. It is a couple of decades India also accepted these, resulting in the gradual change in the lifestyle. Malls and marts popped up. New ethics and style of business were adapted. Curious clientele gradually were being attracted to the mall culture. Repercussion was the deteriorating retail, small and box shops. Govinda Shetty too was a victim of the tsunami of this dangerous evolution. It is the status of lakhs and lakhs of those like him.
 
Bharathi's search unfolds the cruel reality of the invasion of mall culture. Many a gigantic question, appear and disturb us.

Cast 
Sudharani as Bharathi 
Chi. Guru Dutt as Sharath 
H. G. Dattatreya as Govinda Shetty

Reception

Critical response 

Srikanth Srinivasa of Rediff.com scored the film at 3 out of 5 stars and wrote "It’s a uni-dimensional story and just scratches the surface of the problem though it is a sincere effort in focusing on a topical subject". A critic from The Times of India scored the film at 4 out of 5 stars and says "The climax is deeply touching. Sudharani has done a splendid job as the lead character. Chi Gurudutt is equally good. But it is Dattatreya who brings a tear or two in the climax with his brilliant performance. Cinematography by Mahendra Simha is good". A critic from Bangalore Mirror scored the film at 3 out of 5 stars and says "Dattatreya has done justice to his role and rightly deserves the special mention at the National Awards. This is the third time he gets a special mention. His brilliant performance is the soul of the film".

Awards

 2012: 60th National Film Awards: Best Feature Film in Kannada
2012-13: Karnataka State Film Award for Second Best Film

References

External links
 
Official film Page

2010s Kannada-language films
2012 films
Indian children's films
Retailing in India
Best Kannada Feature Film National Film Award winners
Films directed by P. Sheshadri